Gong Ming (born 15 February 1973) is a Chinese ice hockey player. She competed in the women's tournament at the 1998 Winter Olympics.

References

1973 births
Living people
Chinese women's ice hockey players
Olympic ice hockey players of China
Ice hockey players at the 1998 Winter Olympics
Place of birth missing (living people)